Pyrrhospora endaurantia is a species of lichen in the family Lecanoraceae. Found in Kenya, it was described as a new species in 2021 by lichenologists Klaus Kalb and André Aptroot. Here it was found growing on tree twigs in a savannah. The lichen has a dull, pale grey thallus bordered by a black hypothallus about 0.1 mm wide. The specific epithet endaurantia refers to its orange-red subhymenium and orange hypothecium (the tissue immediately below the subhymenium). The thallus of the lichen turns yellow with the K chemical spot test. Thin-layer chromatography showed the presence of atranorin in the thallus.

References

Lecanoraceae
Lichen species
Lichens described in 2021
Lichens of Kenya
Taxa named by André Aptroot
Taxa named by Klaus Kalb